Zola Budd (also known as Zola Pieterse; born 26 May 1966) is a South African middle-distance and long-distance runner. She competed at the 1984 Olympic Games for Great Britain and the 1992 Olympic Games for South Africa, both times in the 3000 metres. In 1984 (unratified) and 1985, she broke the world record in the 5000 metres. She was also a two-time winner at the World Cross Country Championships (1985–1986). Budd mainly trained and raced barefoot. Her mile best of 4:17.57 in 1985, still stands as the British record.

She returned to South Africa in 1989, and represented South Africa at the 1992 Summer Olympics. She moved with her family to South Carolina, USA in 2008; and competed at marathons and ultramarathons. She moved back to South Africa in 2020-2021.

Athletics career

5000 metres world record
Budd, who was born in Bloemfontein, Orange Free State, South Africa, achieved fame in early 1984, at the age of 17, when she broke the 5000 m world record with a time of 15:01.83. Since her performance took place in South Africa, then excluded from international athletics competition because of its segregation policy, the International Amateur Athletics Federation (IAAF) refused to ratify Budd's time as an official world record.

In 1985, she claimed the world record officially, while representing Great Britain, clocking 14:48.07.

Arrival in Britain
The Daily Mail, a British tabloid newspaper, persuaded Budd's father to encourage her to apply for Registration as a British citizen (i.e: not naturalisation), on the grounds that her grandfather was British, to circumvent the international sporting boycott of South Africa, so that she could compete in the 1984 Summer Olympics in Los Angeles. With a strong push from the Daily Mail, registration as a British citizen was granted in short order and she moved to Guildford. Her application and arrival was controversial due to her acquiring a passport under preferential circumstances. Groups supporting the abolition of apartheid campaigned vociferously and effectively to highlight the special treatment she received; normal applicants for naturalisation had to wait years to be granted citizenship, if at all.

Shortly afterwards, Budd was forced to pull out of a 1500 metres race in Crawley, Sussex, when the town council withdrew their invitation at short notice. The race was part of the inaugural event for the town's new Bewbush Leisure Centre and Mayor Alf Pegler said members of the council had expressed misgivings that the local significance of the event would be overshadowed by "political connotations and anti-apartheid demonstrators".

She ran her first competitive race on the cinder track at Central Park in Dartford, Kent, covering 3000 m in 9:02.6 in a race shown live on the BBC's Grandstand. She ran in further races in Britain, including the UK Championships 1500 m (won in 4:04) and the 3000 m in the UK Olympic trials, which she won in 8:40, earning a place on the British Olympic team. In the 2000 m at Crystal Palace in July 1984 she set a new world record of 5:33.15. Commenting during the race for the BBC, David Coleman exclaimed, "The message will now be flashed around the world – Zola Budd is no myth."

In Britain, Budd trained at Aldershot, Farnham and District Athletics Club.

1984 Olympic 3000 metres

In the 1984 Olympics, held in Los Angeles, California, the media billed the 3000 m race as a duel between Budd and world champion Mary Decker; however experts predicted Decker's main competition to be Romanian Maricica Puică, who had set the fastest time that year.

Decker set a fast pace from the gun with Budd in close pursuit, followed by Puică and Britain's Wendy Sly. When the pace slowed just past the midway point, Budd took the lead on the straight and ran wide of the pack around the turn. Setting the pace, she took herself, Decker, Sly and Puică clear of the pack. Running as a group was an unusual situation for Budd and Decker, both of whom were used to running in front and well ahead of other competitors.

At 1700 metres, the first collision occurred. Decker came into contact with one of Budd's legs, knocking Budd slightly off balance. However, both women maintained their close position. Five strides on, at race time of 4:58, Budd and Decker again made contact, with Budd's left foot brushing Decker's thigh, causing Budd to lose her balance and sending her into Decker's path. Decker's spiked running shoe came down hard into Budd's ankle, just above the heel, drawing blood. Videotapes later examined by Olympic officials showed Budd visibly in pain. However, Budd maintained equilibrium and kept stride.

Decker stepped on Budd; then, shortly after, she collided with the British runner and fell spectacularly to the curb, injuring her hip. As a result, Mary Decker did not finish the race. Decker was carried off the track in tears by her boyfriend (and later, husband), British discus thrower Richard Slaney.

Budd, deeply affected by the occurrence, continued to lead for a while, but faded, finishing seventh. Her finishing time of 8:48 was well outside her best of 8:37. Budd tried to apologise to Decker in the tunnel after the race, but Decker was upset, and replied, "Don’t bother!" Puică won, with Sly second, and Canada's Lynn Williams third.

An IAAF jury found that she was not responsible for the collision. Decker said many years after the event: "The reason I fell, some people think she tripped me deliberately. I happen to know that wasn’t the case at all. The reason I fell is because I am and was very inexperienced in running in a pack."

In general, it is the trailing athlete's responsibility to avoid contact with the runner ahead; whether or not Budd had sufficient control of the race to have pulled into the curve as she naturally did was hotly disputed. "This doesn't mean," track journalist Kenny Moore wrote in the aftermath, "that a leader can swerve in with impunity, but that in the give and take of pack running, athletes learn to make allowances." At first the US media sided with Decker, while the British press supported Budd.

In 2002, the moment was ranked 93rd in Channel 4's 100 Greatest Sporting Moments. On an episode of Celebrity Come Dine with Me, Budd stated that, to that time she had never seen footage of the collision.

International competition
Budd competed internationally for the UK in 1985 and 1986. In February 1985, she was World Cross Country Champion (beating Ingrid Kristiansen), but then went on to several track defeats. The most significant of these was her rematch with Mary Decker-Slaney at Crystal Palace in July 1985, in which she finished fourth, some 13 seconds behind Decker-Slaney.

Budd's form improved significantly after this race, however, as she then went on to break the UK and Commonwealth records for the 1500 m (in 3:59.96), the mile (4:17.57), the 3000m (8:28.83) and the 5000m (14:48.07). This last reduced the world record by ten seconds. She was also victor in the European Cup 3000m. Her best times in the 1500m, mile run and 3000m were set in races with Decker-Slaney and Maricica Puică. Budd finished third in all three races, with Decker-Slaney and Puică consistently coming first and second, respectively.

1986 began with a defence of her World Cross Country title and a world indoor 3000m record of 8:39.79. However, after a couple of victories in fast early season times over 1500m (4:01.93) and 3000m (8:34.72), her outdoor track season brought several defeats by athletes she should have beaten easily. She competed in both the 1500m and 3000m at the European Championships but did not win a medal in either, finishing 9th and 4th, respectively. It later emerged that Budd was suffering a painful leg injury for much of the season; she did not compete in 1987 as she sought treatment for this.

Personal life

Suspension, return to South Africa and marriage
In 1988, Budd began to compete again with a handful of cross-country runs. However, several African nations claimed she had competed in an event in South Africa and insisted she be suspended from competition. Budd said she only attended the event and did not compete. The International Amateur Athletics Federation upheld this charge and suspended Budd, at which point she returned to South Africa, and retired from international competition for several years.

In 1989, Budd married Mike Pieterse. The couple have three children, daughter Lisa and twins, Azelle and Mike. Also in 1989, Budd published her autobiography, Zola (co-written with Hugh Eley). 

On her return to South Africa, Budd began racing again. She had an excellent season in 1991 and was the second-fastest woman in the world over 3000m. Following South Africa's re-admission to international sport, she competed in the 3000m at the 1992 Summer Olympics in Barcelona but did not qualify for the final. In 1993, she finished fourth at the World Cross Country championships but would never translate this form on to the track. 

Budd remains the holder of numerous British and South African records at junior and senior levels, and still holds two junior world records: the mile and 3000m.

Relocation to U.S.

Following allegations of her husband having an affair with former Miss South Africa Agatha "Pinkie" Pelser, Budd, under her married name Pieterse, and her three children relocated to Myrtle Beach, South Carolina, US, in August 2008; Zola’s husband joined them later. She initially had a two-year visa that allowed her to compete on the US masters' circuit. She raced in the South Carolina division of USA Track and Field, winning the women's division of the Dasani Half-Marathon during Bi-Lo Myrtle Beach Marathon on 14 February 2009 with a time of 1:20:41.

On 12 January 2012, she announced her participation in the 2012 edition of the nearly  Comrades (ultra)Marathon which was held on 3 June 2012. She would also participate in the Two Oceans Marathon during the Easter weekend of 2012 as she trained towards the Comrades Marathon which she ended up finishing in 8:06:09 (she was the 37th female finisher), earning a Bill Rowan Medal. Although she planned to also run the Comrades in 2013 she withdrew due to illness.

In June 2014, Budd entered the Comrades again, hoping for an overall silver medal and for a time under 7 hours 30 minutes (7:30:00). Budd beat her time target, finishing with a time of 6:55:55 and earning a gold medal for a top 10 finish as well as a gold medal as the 1st 'veteran' (senior) finisher while coming in as the 7th female finisher overall (the first six being at least 10 years her junior). Budd dedicated her 2014 Comrades run to South African teacher Pierre Korkie, held captive in Yemen by Al-Qaeda for one year. She was stripped of her 'veteran' gold medal (but not of her cash prize for finishing 7th overall) following accusations that she did not display a small age category tag on her running vest, in addition to the veteran designation already displayed on her running bib. Budd and her coach pointed out that the veteran gold medal and silver medal were then given to two runners who also did not have the small age category tag on their running vests, and announced in September 2014 that they had started court proceedings against the Comrades Marathon Association to have her veteran win reinstated.

In March 2015, Budd won the Run Hard Columbia (SC) Marathon in a time of 3:05:27.

As of July 2020, she was an Assistant Cross Country and Girls Track Coach at Conway High School in Conway, South Carolina; and volunteered as assistant coach at Coastal Carolina University, also in Conway.

She moved back to South Africa in 2021.

Cultural impact
In South Africa today, township taxis are nicknamed "Zola Budd" for their speed. The singer Brenda Fassie (whom Time magazine called "the Madonna of the townships" in 2001) had a hit single in the 1980s with her track "Zola Budd".
On 20 July 2012 BBC Radio 4 broadcast a play by Richard Monks about the political and media actions taken to bring Zola Budd to Britain with her father at the age of 17, the script implying she was unwilling and homesick.

Personal bests

International competitions

References

External links

 
 SportsIllustrated.com – SI cover: Back on Track – Mary Decker-Slaney beats Zola Budd in London
 dartfordharriersac.co.uk – Dartford Harriers website with reference to Budd's race in 1984

1966 births
Living people
Afrikaner people
Athletes (track and field) at the 1984 Summer Olympics
Athletes (track and field) at the 1992 Summer Olympics
British female long-distance runners
British female marathon runners
British female middle-distance runners
World record setters in athletics (track and field)
World Athletics Cross Country Championships winners
British masters athletes
South African masters athletes
Olympic athletes of Great Britain
Olympic athletes of South Africa
Sportspeople from Bloemfontein
South African autobiographers
South African emigrants to the United States
South African expatriate sportspeople in the United Kingdom
South African female cross country runners
South African female long-distance runners
South African female marathon runners
South African female middle-distance runners
South African people of British descent
Sport and apartheid in South Africa
Citizens of the United Kingdom through descent